GoGuardian is a student monitoring software. Its company with the same name was founded in 2014 and based in Los Angeles, California. The company's services monitor student activity online, filter content, and alert school officials to possible suicidal or self-harm ideation.

GoGuardian's access to private data has concerned parents and scholars, and the company has been accused of overreach.

Product history 
GoGuardian was founded in 2014 and is based in Los Angeles, CA. Its feature set includes computer filtering, monitoring, and management, as well as usage analytics, activity flagging, and theft recovery for ChromeOS devices. GoGuardian also offers filtering functionality for third-party tools such as YouTube.

On June 2015, GoGuardian reported it was installed in over 1,600 of the estimated 15,000 school districts in the United States.

In January 2015, Los Angeles Unified School District (LAUSD) chose GoGuardian to support their 1:1 device rollout program. This provides LAUSD device tracking and grade-level-specific filtering, and facilitates compliance with the Children's Internet Protection Act (CIPA).

In September 2015, the company released GoGuardian for Teachers, a tool to monitor student activity and control student learning. In January 2016, GoGuardian announced the launch of Google Classroom integration for GoGuardian for Teachers.

In May 2018, GoGuardian was acquired by private equity firm Sumeru Equity Partners and appointed Tony Miller to their board of directors.

In August 2018, GoGuardian launched Beacon, a software system installed on school computers that analyzes students' browsing behavior to alert people concerned of students at risk of suicide or self-harm.

In November 2020, GoGuardian merged with Pear Deck.

Student privacy
GoGuardian products allow teachers and administrators to view and snapshot students' computer screens, close and open browser tabs, and see running applications. GoGuardian can collect information about any activity when users are logged onto their accounts, including data originating from a student's webcam, microphone, keyboard, and screen, along with historical data such as browsing history. This collection can be performed whether students connect from school-provided or personally-owned devices. Parents have raised privacy concerns over this data collection, claiming the software is spyware.

In 2016, researcher Elana Zeide raised the concern that the use of GoGuardian software for suicide prevention, though "well-meaning", could result in "overreach". Zeide further noted that legitimate personal reasons could motivate a student to wish to search for sensitive information in private. According to Zeide, this concern is compounded by the fact that school devices may be the only devices for lower-income students. American School Counselor Association ethics chair Carolyn Stone said that GoGuardian's ability to track web searches conducted at home is "intrusive" and is "conditioning children to accept constant monitoring" as normal.

Until October 2015, GoGuardian software was able to track keystrokes and remotely activate student webcams. GoGuardian said that the features were removed as part of its "ongoing commitment to student privacy."

GoGuardian technical product manager Cody Rice stated in 2016 that schools had control over GoGuardian's collection and management of data and that no client had complained about privacy.

Recognition 
 Inc. 500
 Deloitte's Fast 500
 In 2018, GoGuardian was named as the 27th fastest growing technology company in North America.
 Forbes 30 Under 30
 In January 2016, two of the company's co-founders, Aza Steel and Advait Shinde, were named to Forbes magazine's annual "30 Under 30" list in the Education category.
 International Design Awards Gold: GoGuardian Teacher
 2016 Awards of Excellence Tech and Learning

References

Internet safety
Child safety
Companies based in Los Angeles
Software companies based in California
Security companies of the United States
Computer security software
Software companies of the United States

Further reading
 Spying on Students: School-Issued Devices and Student Privacy a study by the Electronic Frontier Foundation
 GoGuardian Beacon  listed as a 2018 "Silver in Education / Behavioral correction tools" by International Design Awards
 School Software Walks The Line Between Safety Monitor And 'Parent Over Shoulder'  by Larry Magid writing in Forbes